Siluosaurus (meaning "Silu (Chinese for Silk Road, referring to the discovery location) lizard")is a genus of ornithopod dinosaur from the Barremian-Albian-age Lower Cretaceous Xinminbao Group of Gansu, China. It is based on the specimen IVPP V.11117 (1-2), which consists of two teeth. It is an obscure genus, with no papers doing more than mentioning it since it was described in 1997. The type species is S. zhanggiani.

History
The holotype teeth of Siluosaurus were recovered during the 1992 Sino-Japanese Silk Road Dinosaur Expedition in the lower portion of the Xinminbao Group. One tooth, seven millimetres long, was from the upper beak (premaxilla), and the other, 3.7 millimetres high, was from the cheek region of the upper jaw (maxilla). Dong Zhiming, who named the genus in 1997, suggested that it was a hypsilophodontid, and described the teeth as the smallest ornithopod teeth yet known. The type species is Siluosaurus zhanggiani. The specific name honours Zhang Qian, the Chinese diplomat who reconnoitred the Silk Road in the second century B.C. It was regarded without comment as a dubious name in the most recent review of basal ornithopods, a not-uncommon fate for dinosaur names based on teeth.

Paleobiology
As a hypsilophodontid or other basal ornithopod, Siluosaurus would have been a bipedal herbivore.

References

Ornithopods
Early Cretaceous dinosaurs of Asia
Taxa named by Dong Zhiming
Fossil taxa described in 1997
Paleontology in Gansu
Ornithischian genera